The women's high jump event at the 1994 Commonwealth Games was held at the Centennial Stadium in Victoria, British Columbia.

Medalists

Results

Qualification

Final

References

High
1994
1994 in women's athletics